Welcome Matt is a 2021 American comedy-drama film written and directed by Leon Pierce Jr. and starring Tahj Mowry, GG Townson, Deon Cole and Jazsmin Lewis.

Premise
Matt is an aspiring writer/director in his 20s who suffers from agoraphobia following a traumatizing experience.  Not wanting to leave his apartment, Matt decides to make his movie there. Following the breakup with his girlfriend as well as an eviction notice, Matt decides to see an at-home therapist to overcome his agoraphobia.

Cast
Tahj Mowry as Matt
Aaron Grady as Cedric
Deon Cole as Norman
Jazsmin Lewis as Angela
Dorien Wilson as Harold
GG Townson as Lisa

Release
Gravitas Ventures acquired North American distribution rights to the film in March 2021.  The film was released in theaters and on demand on May 28, 2021.

References

External links
 
 

2020s English-language films